Eglinton Avenue is a major east–west arterial thoroughfare in Toronto and Mississauga in the Canadian province of Ontario. The street begins at Highway 407 (but does not interchange with the tollway) at the western limits of Mississauga, as a continuation of Lower Baseline in Milton. It traverses the midsection of both cities and ends at Kingston Road. Eglinton Avenue is the only street to cross all six former boroughs of Metropolitan Toronto.

The Toronto section was surveyed in the 19th century as the Fourth Concession Road (with the first being Queen Street). It was historically known as Richview Sideroad in Etobicoke and Lower Baseline in Mississauga. It was also designated Highway 5A (and later Highway 109) in Scarborough.

History 
There are two sources for the naming of Eglinton Avenue. Henry Scadding in an early history of the city wrote that it originated from Eglinton Castle in Scotland, itself named for the Earls of Eglinton. Several early settlers, impressed by the Eglinton Tournament of 1839 hosted by the 13th Earl, named the hamlet developing in the area as the Village of Eglinton after the Earl. More likely is the humbler story that it was named by the tavern keeper John Montgomery who settled in the area in 1830 and named the village after the Earl of Eglinton of the Montgomerie family, to whom he believed he had a family connection.

The wagon trail connecting to Yonge between the third and fifth concessions (St. Clair and Lawrence Avenues respectively) soon adopted the name of the village and was gradually improved over the years near Yonge Street. In 1890, the area was incorporated as North Toronto, and in 1912, it was annexed to Toronto itself. In 1953, Metropolitan Toronto (commonly known as Metro) was formed. Seeking to build new connections to the rapidly developing suburbs, Metro widened and interconnected Eglinton to its current form through the decade.

The eastern segment through Scarborough was known as Highway 5A between 1937 and 1953; this number also appeared on St. Clair Avenue West until 1952 when the Toronto Bypass, (the precursor to Highway 401), opened between Weston and Highway 11 (Yonge Street). The two pieces of "Highway 5A" were never connected. In 1953, what remained was renumbered as Highway 109; a year later, the road was removed from the provincial highway system. Because of its time as a provincial highway, the road through Scarborough was widened considerably. A right of way was also acquired to bridge the gap in Eglinton. Until the mid-1950s, Eglinton did not cross either of the valleys of the Don River. The road ended at Brentcliffe Road (unassigned path beyond Laird towards Brentcliffe and the dump was once site of hangar for Leaside Aerodrome) and resumed at Victoria Park Avenue (then known as Dawes Road). This break resulted in a bypassed eastern stub at Bermondsey Road signed as Old Eglinton Avenue. The Department of Highways relinquished control of Highway 109 to the newly formed Metro government. Metro built the new section of Eglinton Avenue, first between Dawes Road and Don Mills Road in 1955, and later between Don Mills Road and Leaside in 1956.

In the west, the street ended at the Humber River until 1970. On the opposite side in Etobicoke, the Richview Sideroad followed the same alignment as far as the Metro Toronto–Peel boundary. That year, the river was bridged to connect the Richview Sideroad segment as an extension of Eglinton. At about the same time, when the Highways 401 and 427 interchange was reconstructed, the street was connected to Lower Base Line, extending the street even further west into Mississauga. West of Mississauga, in Halton Region, it is a rural road and is still named Lower Base Line (the corresponding Upper Base Line being present-day Steeles Avenue).

The structure over the GO rail line and East Don River is known as the Harvey C. Rose Bridge, and honours the chief engineer of the Toronto and York Roads Commission, later the Metropolitan Toronto Commission of Roads.

Richview Expressway proposal 

In 1943, city planner Norman Wilson indicated the possible future need for a new urban highway to connect Eglinton Avenue with the Richview Sideroad. These plans would mature into the Richview Expressway with the formation of Metropolitan Toronto in 1954. Part of the requirements for the Richview Expressway was a staged construction of a parallel arterial road. This was approved in 1963, and construction began on Eglinton Avenue from west of Weston Road to Royal York Road. With its completion in 1970, the four-lane Richview Sideroad was renamed Eglinton Avenue West.

In Toronto, the right-of-way to construct the Richview Expressway remains but the project has never come to fruition, save for high-speed ramps from Eglinton to Highways 401 and 427 at the complicated interchange near Renforth station. Local opposition has made the proposed expressway unlikely, though the land remains owned by the city.

Route description 

Eglinton Avenue runs through a number of neighbourhoods and is residential, for the most part, though it becomes a major commercial area from Allen Road to Don Mills Road. The Eglinton West or "Little Jamaica" area, which stretches from Oakwood–Vaughan to Keele Street, is home to a number of Caribbean and West Indian stores.

Eglinton Avenue is one of the few east–west routes north of Bloor Street that crosses Toronto uninterrupted in a more or less straight line across the entire city. Eglinton was also the only street to cross through all six of the municipalities that made up Metro Toronto: East York, Etobicoke, North York, Scarborough, Toronto, and York. The section between the Etobicoke Creek and Renforth Drive forms part of the city limits of Toronto and Mississauga.

Sites along Eglinton 

There are many notable sites and landmarks along Eglinton Avenue; they include the Erin Mills Town Centre, Centennial Park, Little Jamaica, the Eglinton Flats sports park, Eglinton Park, Yonge Eglinton Centre, the Canada Square Complex, Sunnybrook Park, the TVOntario Headquarters, the Ontario Science Centre, the Eglinton Square Shopping Centre, The Golden Mile, and Toronto East Detention Centre.

Public transit

Bus

The Toronto Transit Commission (TTC) operates bus routes 32 Eglinton West (between Eglinton subway station to Renforth MiWay Terminal), 34 Eglinton East (between Eglinton and Kennedy station), 51 Leslie, 54 Lawrence East and 56 Leaside (between Eglinton to Leslie Street). East of Kennedy station, routes 86 Scarborough, 116 Morningside, 905 Eglinton East Express and 986 Scarborough Express provide regular all-day service (until 2014, 34 Eglinton East provided service east of Kennedy station). Overnight service is provided by 332 Eglinton West Blue Night (between Eglinton Station and Pearson airport), 334 Eglinton East Blue Night (between Eglinton Station and Finch and Neilson).  

In Mississauga, MiWay route 35 Eglinton serves almost the entire length of the street within that city, 34 Credit Valley serves the section west of Hurontario Street, and 7 Airport serves the section east of Hurontario; also sections of the road are served by routes 17 Timberlea, 89 Meadowvale-Skymark and 109 Meadowvale Express during peak hours.

Rapid transit

Current services
 (at Allen Road), Eglinton (at Yonge Street), and Kennedy (at the eastern and southern termini of Line 2 Bloor–Danforth and Line 3 Scarborough) stations of the Toronto subway system are located on Eglinton, where the respective lines cross it.

In Mississauga, a grade-separated bus rapid transit line follows parallel along Eglinton Avenue stopping at: Etobicoke Creek, Spectrum, Orbitor and Renforth. All of these stations are located at the Airport Corporate Centre at the east end of Mississauga, just south of Toronto Pearson International Airport. Renforth Station is a terminal hub for TTC, GO Transit, and MiWay buses; meanwhile, the other three are exclusively served by MiWay.

Past projects and proposals
The provincial government of Bob Rae started work on the Eglinton West line of the Toronto subway in 1994 as a way of appeasing politicians in Etobicoke and York who demanded rapid transit expansion in their constituencies after the city of North York successfully lobbied for the Sheppard line. The underground subway line was approved despite the official transit plan only recommended a bus rapid transit line for the road in the near future. The Eglinton line was abandoned by Rae's successor Mike Harris after construction had started at Eglinton West station and underground excavation was filled in.

The Eglinton Crosstown LRT was unveiled as part of the TTC's Transit City light rail expansion program in 2007, which proposed an underground line to run from Jane Street to Laird Drive, with above ground sections running to Pearson International Airport in the west and to Kennedy station in Scarborough in the east. The provincial government's MoveOntario 2020 capital funding announcement in June 2007 funded the line.

Toronto mayor Rob Ford announced the cancellation of Transit City on the day that he took office. The redesigned Eglinton–Scarborough Crosstown line along with a Line 4 Sheppard extension was announced four months later, with the support of Metrolinx and Ontario Premier Dalton McGuinty.

The redesign put the  Eglinton portion completely underground, integrated the Scarborough RT portion, and would run contiguously from Black Creek Drive in the west to McCowan Road in the east. The redesign has since been shelved with construction plans reverting to the original design.

Future 
Once the first phase of Line 5 Eglinton is completed by Metrolinx in 2023, the existing bus lanes on Eglinton between Black Creek Drive and Kennedy Road will be significantly reduced, providing an opportunity to redesign the street.  In 2014, the City of Toronto government released a report proposing a redesign of the street to provide generally a four lane roadway over the underground LRT, with a three lanes (two traffic and centre turning lane) between Avenue Road and Mount Pleasant Road. The variation in number of lanes is based on lower car traffic volumes near Yonge Street.  The redesign would also provide wider sidewalks and a continuous raised bicycle lane that would be the longest bike lane in the city. The initial implementation of the redesign would be carried out with the reconstruction at Crosstown line station locations that would be funded as part of the Crosstown line project.  Reconstruction between stations will be funded by the city and is proposed to be carried out after completion of the Crosstown line so that this does not interfere with the Metrolinx construction activity.  A planning process called Eglinton Connects drew on public consultation to evaluate options for the redesign.

See also 
 Yonge–Eglinton

References 

Roads in the Regional Municipality of Peel
Roads in Toronto